Background may refer to:

Performing arts and stagecraft 
 Background actor
 Background artist
 Background light
 Background music
 Background story
 Background vocals
 Background (play), a 1950 play by Warren Chetham-Strode

Recorded works 
 Background (1953 film), a British drama
 Background (1973 film), a documentary
 Background (TV series), a Canadian journalistic television series
 Background (Lifetime album), 1992
 Background (Bassi Maestro album), 2002

Science and engineering 
 Background extinction rate
 Background independence, a condition in theoretical physics
 Background noise
 Background radiation, the natural radiation that is always present in a location
 Background (astronomy), small amounts of light coming from otherwise dark parts of the sky
 Cosmic background (disambiguation)
 Gravitational wave background
 X-ray background
 Background process, software that is running but not being displayed
 String background
 Computer wallpaper

Other uses
 Background (journalism)
 Cultural heritage
 Ethnic background
 Field (heraldry), background of a shield
 Natural heritage
 Provenance

See also
 Backgrounding, a way of feeding livestock before selling them
 Figure and ground (disambiguation)
 Foreground and background (disambiguation)
 Heritage (disambiguation)